Stoff is an English surname, originating in Early Middle Ages England. Notable people with the surname include:

Denis Stoff, stage name of the Ukrainian musician Denis Shaforostov (born 1992)
Erwin Stoff (born 1951), American film producer

See also
List of stoffs

References

Germanic-language surnames